Tuas station was the provisional name for Gul Circle MRT station – a Singapore Mass Rapid Transit (MRT) station. 

Other stations that contain the name "Tuas" are:

Tuas Crescent MRT station, an MRT station on the East West line (EWL)
Tuas West Road MRT station, another MRT station on the EWL.
Tuas Link MRT station, the terminus of the EWL.

See also
 Tuas Depot
 Tuas